The Vatican City women's national football team is the  team that represents Vatican City in association football and is under the control of the Vatican Amateur Sports Association, headquartered in the Vatican's Cortile di San Damaso. Gianfranco Guadagnoli, an Italian, is the current head coach, in addition to being the coach of the men's national team. Susan Volpini is the current manager.

History
At Vatican Family Day in June 2018, a group of women organized to play football against each other as the male employees had done for years. Soon after they competed in a tournament organized by the Bambino Gesù Hospital.

The national representative team was first formed in 2019 and played its first match on 26 May of that year. The team took on A.S. Roma of the women's Serie A, the highest level of women's football in Italy. The Vatican side lost 0–10 at the Campo Pio XI.

On 7 June 2019 the team played their first "away" match, traveling across Rome to face the women's team of Serie D club A.S.D. Trastevere Calcio. Despite the 1–3 defeat, the Vatican City team earned a penalty kick which was converted for the team's first-ever goal.

After several months of preparation and planning, the team traveled to Austria to face Wiener Landesliga (women's third division) side FC Mariahilf at a stadium in Simmering in Vienna on 22 June 2019 as part of the club's twentieth anniversary. However, the match was abandoned after several FCM players displayed pro-choice t-shirts under their jerseys during the playing of Vatican City's national anthem.

Players
As of 2018 there are approximately 800 female employees of Vatican City. The squad consists of female Vatican employees and wives and daughters of Vatican employees. In 2019, about 20 to 25 women between the ages of 25 and 50 comprised the squad. There were only lay workers and no nuns on the squad but nuns are welcome to play. Although most team members are merely amateur players, some, such as Cameroonian captain Eugenie Tcheugoue, have played at higher levels.

Team image

Kits and crest
As of 2019 the team wears an all yellow Givova top with the Sport Association logo in the center of the chest.

Home stadium
The Vatican City women's national football team plays their home matches on the Campo Pio XI.

Results and fixtures
The following is a list of match results in the last 12 months, as well as any future matches that have been scheduled.

Legend

2019

Coaching staff

Current coaching staff

Notable players

  Eugenie Tcheugoue - captain

Manager history

See also
Sport in Vatican City
Vatican City men's national football team
Campionato della Città del Vaticano
List of football clubs in Vatican City
Index of Vatican City-related articles

References

European national and official selection-teams not affiliated to FIFA
Women